Pulmonary carcinoid tumour is a neuroendocrine tumour of the lung.

There are two types:
 Typical pulmonary carcinoid tumour
 Atypical pulmonary carcinoid tumour

References

External links 

Lung carcinoids (cancer.org)

Pulmonary tumour